The 2022 Czech Mixed Doubles Curling Championship was held in Prague from 26 February to 1 March, 2022.

Six teams took part in the championship.

The winners of the championship were team "Dion WC" (Julie Zelingrová / Vít Chabičovský), who beat team "Zbraslav H" (Zuzana Paulová / Tomáš Paul) in the final. The bronze medal was won by team "Trutnov 1" (Jana Jelínková / Ondřej Mihola).

The championship team will represent the Czech Republic at the 2022 World Mixed Doubles Curling Championship.

Teams

Round robin

Playoffs

Semifinal
28 February, 17:30 UTC+1

Final
Game 1
28 February, 14:00 UTC+1

Game 2
28 February, 18:00 UTC+1

Game 3
1 March, 14:00 UTC+1

Final standings

References

See also
2022 Czech Men's Curling Championship
2022 Czech Women's Curling Championship

Czech Mixed Doubles Curling Championship
Czech Mixed Doubles Curling Championship
Curling Mixed Doubles Championship
Czech Mixed Doubles Curling Championship
Czech Mixed Doubles Curling Championship
Sports competitions in Prague